"Í hjarta mér" ("in my heart") is the second single from Egó's album 6. Október. The name of the band is sometimes stylized as EGÓ. The single released on February 19, 2009. The song became a big hit immediately and peaked at  #1 on all charts in Iceland. The single was released as a Digital download only.

Track listing

Personnel 

 Arnar Geir Ómarsson – drums
 Bergþór Morthens – electric guitar
 Bubbi Morthens – vocals, electric guitar & acoustic guitar
 Hrafn Thoroddsen – orgel
 Jakob Magnússon – bass

Charts

References

External links 
 Studio Sýrland
 The Song at Tónlist.is
 Bubbi’s official website
 Sena

2009 singles
Icelandic songs
Icelandic-language songs
2009 songs